Ralph Jacobi  (4 December 192816 January 2002) was an Australian politician. He was an Australian Labor Party member of the Australian House of Representatives from 1969 until 1987.

Before parliament, Jacobi was employed in the merchant navy and was executive officer of the South Australian Trades and Labour Council and secretary of the Australian Government Workers Association. In parliament, he was a member of the Foreign Affairs and Defence and Trade Committee, the Library Committee and the Privileges Committee. He refused to be in a party faction, which reportedly cost him the chairmanship of the foreign affairs and trade committee in 1984. Although a backbencher, he made significant policy contributions in the areas of reforming corporations law and the regulation of the insurance industry.

In 1987, as knowledge of Jacobi's condition of lymphatic cancer became known, nearly all members of the House of Representatives signed a petition for his appointment of the Order of Australia; it was included in the Queen's Birthday Honours, 1987. After leaving politics, he was chair of the Advisory Council of the National Archives of Australia from 1988 to 1991.

Ralph Jacobi died in 2002, aged 73.

References

1928 births
2002 deaths
Australian Labor Party members of the Parliament of Australia
Members of the Australian House of Representatives
Members of the Australian House of Representatives for Hawker
Members of the Order of Australia
20th-century Australian politicians